No Leave, No Love  is a 1946 American musical film directed by Charles Martin and starring Van Johnson, Keenan Wynn and Pat Kirkwood.

Plot
The story concerns Mike, a Marine and recipient of the Congressional Medal of Honor, who returns with his pal Slinky from fighting in the Pacific during World War II. Mike expects to marry his hometown sweetheart; his mother wants to tell him in person that she has married someone else. Most of the film involves the efforts of Susan, a popular radio personality, to keep him from finding out or going home until his mother makes it to New York from Indiana. Susan and Mike fall in love; misunderstandings ensue. The shenanigans of the implausibly unpleasant and larcenous Slinky fill out the action, and the musical element is provided by several appearances of then-famous performers in nightclubs and on Susan’s radio show. The story is bookended by Mike’s arrival in the waiting room of a maternity ward and the birth of his and Susan’s son. Slinky gets the last word when Rosalind announces that she is pregnant.

Cast

Reception
The film earned $2,891,000 in the US and Canada and $894,000 elsewhere resulting in a profit of $629,000.

Critical response
Bosley Crowther of The New York Times writes in his review: "No Leave, No Love starts rambling along about the second reel, when Van Johnson, as the marine hero, turns things over to his pal, Keenan Wynn. And from there on it is mainly a matter of how comical Mr. Wynn can be with little more helpful material than his sense of humor and a big cigar. It must be said to Mr. Wynn's credit—and to the credit of his director, perhaps—that he does pull some fairly funny business in a strictly low-comedy vein, but it is all rather forced and capricious. And it, too, has its saturation points.

References

External links

1946 films
Metro-Goldwyn-Mayer films
1946 musical films
American musical films
American World War II films
Films about the United States Marine Corps
American black-and-white films
1940s English-language films
1940s American films